Brookesia is a genus of chameleons, endemic to Madagascar, that range from small to very small in size, and are known collectively as leaf chameleons (though this name also commonly is used for species in the genera Rieppeleon and Rhampholeon). Brookesia includes species considered to be the world's smallest chameleons, and are also among the smallest reptiles. Members of the genus Brookesia are largely brown and most are essentially terrestrial. 

A significant percentage of the species in the genus were only identified to science within the last three decades, and a number of species that still have not received a scientific name are known to exist. Most inhabit very small ranges in areas that are difficult to access, and due to their small size and secretive nature, they have been relatively poorly studied compared to their larger relatives.

Brookesia are abundant in low-disturbance riparian zones and low-disturbance rainforests. Brookesia are scarce in high-disturbance forests recovering from burning. As of 2021, Brookesia nana is the last known species in its subfamily. Brookesia nana is also the first chameleon not to change colors.

Etymology
The generic name Brookesia is in honor of British naturalist Joshua Brookes.

Conservation status
Most Brookesia are on CITES Appendix II, the only exception being B. perarmata on Appendix I (a species also listed as endangered and a newly discovered Brookesia nana listed as Critically Endangered by IUCN). Consequently, a special permit is required to import any of the below species from their native Madagascar, and typically no permit is issued for B. perarmata.

Species

The genus Brookesia contains the following 31 species which are recognized as being valid.

Brookesia antakarana Raxworthy & Nussbaum, 1995
Brookesia bekolosy Raxworthy & Nussbaum, 1995
Brookesia betschi Brygoo, Blanc & Domergue, 1974 – Blanc's leaf chameleon
Brookesia bonsi Ramanantsoa, 1980
Brookesia brunoi Crottini et al., 2012
Brookesia brygooi Raxworthy & Nussbaum, 1995 – leaf chameleon or Brygoo's chameleon
Brookesia confidens Glaw et al., 2012
Brookesia decaryi Angel, 1939 – spiny leaf chameleon
Brookesia dentata Mocquard, 1900 – toothed leaf chameleon
Brookesia desperata Glaw et al., 2012
Brookesia ebenaui (Boettger, 1880) – northern leaf chameleon
Brookesia exarmata Schimmenti & Jesu, 1996
Brookesia griveaudi Brygoo, Blanc & Domergue, 1974 – Marojejy leaf chameleon
Brookesia karchei Brygoo, Blanc & Domergue, 1970 – naturelle leaf chameleon
Brookesia lambertoni Brygoo & Domergue, 1970 – Fito leaf chameleon
Brookesia lineata Raxworthy & Nussbaum, 1995
Brookesia micra Glaw et al., 2012
Brookesia minima Boettger, 1893 – minute leaf chameleon
Brookesia nana Glaw et al., 2021 – Nano-chameleon
Brookesia perarmata (Angel, 1933) – Antsingy leaf chameleon
Brookesia peyrierasi Brygoo & Domergue, 1974 – Peyrieras's leaf chameleon
Brookesia ramanantsoai Brygoo & Domergue, 1975 – Ramanantsoa's minute leaf chameleon
Brookesia stumpffi Boettger, 1894 – plated leaf chameleon
Brookesia superciliaris (Kuhl, 1820) – brown leaf chameleon
Brookesia tedi Scherz, J. Kohler, Rakotoarison, Glaw & Vences, 2019
Brookesia therezieni Brygoo & Domergue, 1970 – Perinet leaf chameleon
Brookesia thieli Brygoo & Domergue, 1969 – Domergue's leaf chameleon
Brookesia tristis Glaw et al., 2012
Brookesia tuberculata Mocquard, 1894 – Mount d'Ambre leaf chameleon
Brookesia vadoni Brygoo & Domergue, 1968 – Iaraka River leaf chameleon, mossy pygmy leaf chameleon
Brookesia valerieae Raxworthy, 1991 – Raxworthy's leaf chameleon

Nota bene: A binomial authority in parentheses indicates that the species was originally described in a genus other than Brookesia.

See also
 Island dwarfism

References

Further reading
 Gray JE (1864). "Revision of the Genera and Species of Chamæleonidæ, with the Description of some New Species". Proc. Zool. Soc. London 1864: 465-477 + Plates XXXI & XXXII. (Brookesia, new genus, pp. 476–477).

External links

CITES: Appendices I, II and III. Accessed 23-01-2009.
Glaw F, Vences M (2007). A Field Guide to the Amphibians and Reptiles of Madagascar, Third Edition. Cologne, Germany: Vences & Glaw Verlag. 496 pp. .

 
Lizard genera
Taxa named by John Edward Gray